This article provides details on candidates preselected for the 2006 Queensland state election which was held on 9 September 2006.

Retiring MPs

Labor

 Tom Barton (Waterford)
 Darryl Briskey (Cleveland)
 Lesley Clark (Barron River)
 Nita Cunningham (Bundaberg)
 Jim Fouras (Ashgrove)
 Don Livingstone (Ipswich West)
 Tony McGrady (Mount Isa)
 Gordon Nuttall (Sandgate)
 Henry Palaszczuk (Inala)
 Terry Sullivan (Stafford)

Liberal

 Bob Quinn (Robina)

National

 Marc Rowell (Hinchinbrook)

Legislative Assembly

Sitting members are shown in bold text. Successful candidates are highlighted in the relevant colour.

See also
 Members of the Queensland Legislative Assembly, 2004-2006
 2006 Queensland state election

References 

Liberal candidates
National candidates
Greens candidates
ALP candidates
Family First candidates
Poll Bludger Queensland Election Page

2006 elections in Australia
Candidates for Queensland state elections